Amsterdam Institute of Finance, or AIF, is a financial training institute for international finance specialists and other professionals based in Amsterdam, The Netherlands where it offers open enrollment training programs.

Established in 1990 as an initiative of the Dutch financial community and government officials, AIF provides financial training and operates as an independent, not-for-profit and self-supporting foundation.

Previously located on the Stadhouderskade in the Leidseplein area of Amsterdam, AIF moved in early 2013 to a new modern location close to Amsterdam Central Station on the newly developed Oostersdokeiland.

Accreditations
AIF is registered with the international CFA Institute as an Approved Provider of Continuing Education programs. A number of AIF programs are also accredited by PRMIA.

Global Ventures

Master of Science in Risk Management Program for Executives
AIF made news with the announcement of a joint-venture with NYU's Stern School of Business to offer a Master of Science in Risk Management Program for Executives degree. This is a one-year, part-time program divided into five on-site class sessions (modules) at NYU Stern in New York and two rotating global locations, including Amsterdam. Distance learning techniques are used between the modules. The program incorporates traditional and innovative modeling techniques, but aims to situate this knowledge within the larger context of business strategy and risk management. Further program details are also provided through MasterStudies.com

Partnerships and Associations
AIF provides programs in association with a number of international organizations including:
 CFA Institute
 New York University Stern School of Business
 PRMIA - Professional Risk Managers' International Association
 FMO, Entrepreneurial Development Bank
 Hawkamah, the Institute of Corporate Governance
 UC Berkeley Center for Executive Education

Advisory Council
 George A. Möller, Former Chief Executive Officer, Robeco Group
 Petri Hofsté, Former Chief Financial Officer, APG; Member Supervisory Board of Achmea, KASBANK and Fugro
 Steven Kaempfer, Former Vice President, Finance, European Bank for Reconstruction and Development; Member Governing Council, Van Leer Group Foundation
 Nanno Kleiterp, Former Chief Executive Officer, FMO
 Alexander H.G. Rinnooy Kan, Former Chairman, Social and Economic Council of the Netherlands Former Member of the Executive Board, ING Group
 Margot Scheltema, Former Finance Director, Shell (Netherlands); Member Supervisory Board of De Nederlandsche Bank, Schiphol Group, and TNT Express
 Manfred Schepers, Vice President and Chief Financial Officer, European Bank for Reconstruction and Development

See also
Professional certification in financial services
Stern Global Programs
New York Institute of Finance
Swiss Finance Institute
The London Institute of Banking & Finance

Notes

External links 
Amsterdam Institute of Finance website
Master of Science in Risk Management Program for Executives - partnership between NYU Stern School of Business and AIF

Non-profit organisations based in the Netherlands
1990 establishments in the Netherlands
Organizations established in 1990